Bourbon is a type of barrel-aged American whiskey made primarily from corn (maize). The name derives from the French Bourbon dynasty, although the precise source of inspiration is uncertain; contenders include Bourbon County in Kentucky and Bourbon Street in New Orleans, both of which are named after the dynasty. The name bourbon was not applied until the 1850s, and the Kentucky etymology was not advanced until the 1870s.

Bourbon has been distilled since the 18th century. Although bourbon may be made anywhere in the United States, it is strongly associated with the American South in general, and with Kentucky in particular. As of 2014, distillers' wholesale market revenue for bourbon sold within the U.S. was about $2.7 billion, and bourbon made up about two thirds of the $1.6 billion of U.S. exports of distilled spirits. According to the Distilled Spirits Council of the United States, in 2018 U.S. distillers derived $3.6 billion in revenue from bourbon and Tennessee whiskey (a closely related spirit produced in the state of Tennessee).

Bourbon was recognized in 1964 by the U.S. Congress as a "distinctive product of the United States". Bourbon sold in the U.S. must be produced in the country from at least 51% corn and stored in a new container of charred oak.

History

Distilling was most likely brought to present-day Kentucky in the late 18th century by Scots, Scots-Irish, and other settlers (including English, Irish, Welsh, German, and French) who began to farm the area in earnest. The origin of bourbon as a distinct form of whiskey is not well documented and there are many conflicting legends and claims.

For example, the invention of  bourbon is often attributed to Elijah Craig, a Baptist minister and distiller credited with many Kentucky firsts (e.g., fulling mill, paper mill, ropewalk) who is said to have been the first to age the product in charred oak casks, a process that gives bourbon its brownish color and distinctive taste. In Bourbon County, across the county line from Craig's distillery in what was then Fayette County, an early distiller named Jacob Spears is credited with being the first to label his product as Bourbon whiskey.

Although still popular and often repeated, the Craig legend is apocryphal. Similarly, the Spears story is a local favorite but is rarely repeated outside the county. There likely was no single "inventor" of bourbon, which developed into its present form in the late 19th century. Essentially, any type of grain can be used to make whiskey, and the practice of aging whiskey and charring the barrels for better flavor had been known in Europe for centuries. The late date of the Bourbon County etymology has led historian Michael Veach to dispute its authenticity. He proposes the whiskey was named after Bourbon Street in New Orleans, a major port where shipments of Kentucky whiskey sold well as a cheaper alternative to French cognac.

Another proposed origin of the name is the association with the geographic area known as Old Bourbon, consisting of the original Bourbon County in Virginia organized in 1785. This region included much of today's Eastern Kentucky, including 34 of the modern counties. It included the current Bourbon County in Kentucky, which became a county when Kentucky separated from Virginia as a new state in 1792. Numerous newspaper articles reference whiskey from Bourbon County, Kentucky dating as far back as 1824. According to Charles K. Cowdery,

Although many distilleries operated in Bourbon County historically, no distilleries operated there between 1919, when Prohibition began in Kentucky, and late 2014, when a small distillery opened – a period of 95 years. Prohibition devastated the bourbon industry. With the ratification of the 18th amendment in 1919, all distilleries were forced to stop operating, although a few were granted permits to bottle existing stocks of medicinal whiskey. Later, a few  were allowed to resume production when the stocks ran out. Distilleries that were granted permits to produce or bottle medicinal whiskey included Brown-Forman, Frankfort Distillery, James Thompson and Brothers, American Medical Spirits, the Schenley Distillery (modern-day Buffalo Trace Distillery), and the A. Ph. Stitzel Distillery.

A refinement often dubiously credited to James C. Crow is the sour mash process, which conditions each new fermentation with some amount of spent mash. Spent mash is also known as spent beer, distillers' spent grain, stillage, and slop or feed mash, so named because it is used as animal feed. The acid introduced when using the sour mash controls the growth of bacteria that could taint the whiskey and creates a proper pH balance for the yeast to work.

A concurrent resolution adopted by the United States Congress in 1964 declared bourbon to be a "distinctive product of the United States" and asked "the appropriate agencies of the United States Government ... [to] take appropriate action to prohibit importation into the United States of whiskey designated as 'Bourbon Whiskey'." Federal regulation now defines bourbon whiskey to only include bourbon produced in the U.S.

In recent years, bourbon and Tennessee whiskey, which is sometimes regarded as a different type of spirit but generally meets the legal requirements to be called bourbon, have enjoyed significant growth in popularity. The industry trade group Distilled Spirits Council of the United States (DISCUS) tracks sales of bourbon and Tennessee whiskey together.

According to DISCUS, during 2009–2014, the volume of 9-liter cases of whiskey increased by 28.5% overall. Higher-end bourbon and whiskeys experienced the greatest growth. Gross supplier revenues (including federal excise tax) for U.S. bourbon and Tennessee whiskey increased by 46.7% over the 2009–2014 period, with the greatest growth coming from high-end products. In 2014, more than 19 million nine-liter cases of bourbon and Tennessee whiskey were sold in the U.S., generating almost $2.7 billion in wholesale distillery revenue. U.S. exports of bourbon whiskey surpassed $1 billion for the first time in 2013; distillers hailed the rise of a "golden age of Kentucky bourbon" and predicted further growth. In 2014, it was estimated that U.S. bourbon whiskey exports surpassed $1 billion, making up the majority of the U.S. total of $1.6 billion in spirits exports. Major export markets for U.S. spirits are, in descending order: Canada, the United Kingdom, Germany, Australia, and France. The largest percentage increases in U.S. exports were, in descending order: Brazil, the Dominican Republic, Bahamas, Israel, and United Arab Emirates. Key elements of growth in the markets showing the largest increases have been changes of law, trade agreements, and reductions of tariffs, as well as increased consumer demand for premium-category spirits.

Legal requirements

Bourbon's legal definition varies somewhat from country to country, but many trade agreements require that the name "bourbon" be reserved for products made in the U.S. The U.S. regulations for labeling and advertising bourbon apply only to products made for consumption within the U.S.; they do not apply to distilled spirits made for export. Canadian law requires products labeled bourbon to be made in the U.S. and also to conform to the requirements that apply within the U.S. The European Union also requires bourbon to be made in the U.S. following the law of the country. But in other countries, products labeled bourbon may not adhere to the same standards.

The Federal Standards of Identity for Distilled Spirits, codified under 27 CFR §5.22(b)(1)(i), states bourbon made for U.S. consumption must be:

 Produced in the U.S. and its Territories (Puerto Rico), as well as the District of Columbia
 Made from a grain mixture that is at least 51% corn
 Aged in new, charred oak containers
 Distilled to no more than 160 (U.S.) proof (80% alcohol by volume)
 Entered into the container for aging at no more than 125 proof (62.5% alcohol by volume)
 Bottled (like other whiskeys) at 80 proof or more (40% alcohol by volume)

Bourbon has no minimum specified duration for its aging period. Products aged for as little as three months are sold as bourbon. The exception is straight bourbon, which has a minimum aging requirement of two years. In addition, any bourbon aged less than four years must include an age statement on its label.

Bourbon that meets the above requirements, has been aged for a minimum of two years, and does not have added coloring, flavoring, or other spirits may be – but is not required to be – called straight bourbon.
 Bourbon that is labeled as straight that has been aged under four years must be labeled with the duration of its aging.
 Bourbon that has an age stated on its label must be labeled with the age of the youngest whiskey in the bottle (not counting the age of any added neutral grain spirits in a bourbon that is labeled as blended, as neutral-grain spirits are not considered whiskey under the regulations and are not required to be aged at all).

Bottled-in-bond bourbon is a sub-category of straight bourbon and must be aged at least four years.

Bourbon that is labeled blended (or as a blend) may contain added coloring, flavoring, and other spirits, such as un-aged neutral grain spirits, but at least 51% of the product must be straight bourbon.

"High rye bourbon" is not a legally defined term but usually means a bourbon with 20–35% rye. High-wheat bourbons are described as more mild and subdued compared to high-rye varieties.

Bourbon that has been aged for fewer than three years cannot legally be referred to as whiskey (or whisky) in the EU.

Geographic origin

On May 4, 1964, the U.S. Congress recognized bourbon whiskey as a "distinctive product of the United States" by concurrent resolution. Bourbon may be produced anywhere in the U.S. where it is legal to distill spirits, but most brands are produced in Kentucky, where bourbon production has a strong historical association. The filtering of iron-free water through the high concentrations of limestone that are unique to the area is often touted by bourbon distillers in Kentucky as a signature step in the bourbon-making process.

On August 2, 2007, the U.S. Senate passed a resolution sponsored by Senator Jim Bunning (R-KY) officially declaring September 2007 to be National Bourbon Heritage Month, commemorating the history of bourbon whiskey. Notably, the resolution claimed that Congress had declared bourbon to be "America's Native Spirit" in its 1964 resolution. However, the 1964 resolution did not contain such a statement; it declared bourbon to be a distinctive product identifiable with the U.S. (in a similar way that Scotch is considered identifiable with Scotland). The resolution was passed again in 2008.

As of 2018, approximately 95% of all bourbon is produced in Kentucky, according to the Kentucky Distillers' Association. As of 2018, there were 68 whiskey distilleries in Kentucky, this was up 250 percent in the past ten years. At that time, the state had more than 8.1 million barrels of bourbon that were aging – a number that greatly exceeds the state's population of about 4.3 million.

Bardstown, Kentucky, is home to the annual Bourbon Festival held each September. It has been called the "Bourbon Capital of the World" by the Bardstown Tourism Commission and the Kentucky Bourbon Festival organizers who have registered the phrase as a trademark. The Kentucky Bourbon Trail is the name of a tourism promotion program organized by the Kentucky Distillers' Association that is aimed at attracting visitors to the distilleries in Kentucky, particularly Four Roses (Lawrenceburg), Heaven Hill (Bardstown), Jim Beam (Clermont), Maker's Mark (Loretto), Town Branch (Lexington), Wild Turkey (Lawrenceburg), and Woodford Reserve (Versailles).

Tennessee is home to other major bourbon makers, although most prefer to call their product "Tennessee whiskey" instead, including giant Jack Daniel's. It is legally defined under Tennessee House Bill 1084, the North American Free Trade Agreement and at least one other international trade agreement as the recognized name for a straight bourbon whiskey produced in Tennessee. It is also required to meet the legal definition of bourbon under Canadian law.

Although some Tennessee whiskey makers maintain that a pre-aging filtration through chunks of maple charcoal, known as the Lincoln County Process and legally mandated since 2013, make its flavor distinct from bourbon, U.S. regulations defining bourbon neither require nor prohibit its use.

Bourbon also was and is made in other U.S. states. The largest bourbon distiller outside of Kentucky and Tennessee is MGP of Indiana, which primarily wholesales its spirits products to bottling companies that sell them under about 50 different brand names – in some cases, misleadingly marketed as "craft" whiskey, despite being produced at a large wholesaler's factory.

Production process

To be legally sold as bourbon, the whiskey's mash bill requires a minimum of 51% corn, with the remainder being any cereal grain. A proposed change to U.S. regulations will expand allowable "grains" to include seeds of the pseudocereals amaranth, buckwheat, and quinoa. A mash bill that contains wheat instead of rye produces what is known as a wheated bourbon. The grain is ground and mixed with water. Usually mash from a previous distillation is added to ensure consistency across batches, creating a sour mash. Finally, yeast is added, and the mash is fermented. It is distilled to (typically) between 65% and 80% alcohol using either a traditional alembic (or pot still) or the much less expensive continuous still. Most modern bourbons are initially run off using a column still and then redistilled in a "doubler" (alternatively known as a "thumper" or "retort") that is basically a pot still.

The resulting clear spirit, called "white dog", is placed in charred new oak containers for aging. In practice, these containers are generally barrels made from American white oak. The spirit gains its color and much of its flavor from the caramelized sugars and vanillins in the charred wood. Straight bourbon must be aged at least two years, and blended bourbon must contain at least 51% straight bourbon on a proof gallon basis (i.e., most of the alcohol in the blend must be from straight bourbon). The remainder of the spirits in a blended bourbon may be neutral grain spirits that are not aged at all. If a product is labeled merely as bourbon whiskey rather than straight or blended, no specific minimum aging period is prescribed – only that the product has been "stored at not more than 62.5% alcohol by volume (125 proof) in charred new oak containers". Bourbons gain more color and flavor the longer they age in wood. Changes to the spirit also occur due to evaporation and chemical processes such as oxidation. Lower-priced bourbons tend to be aged relatively briefly. Even for higher-priced bourbons, "maturity" rather than a particular age duration is often the goal, as over-aging bourbons can negatively affect the flavor of the bourbon (making it taste woody, bitter, or unbalanced).

After maturing, bourbon is withdrawn from the barrel and is typically filtered and diluted with water. It is then bottled at no less than 80 US proof (40% abv). Although most bourbon whiskey is sold at 80 US proof, other common proofs are 86, 90, and 100. All "bottled in bond" bourbon is 100 proof. Some higher-proof bottlings are marketed as "barrel proof", meaning they have not been diluted or have been only lightly diluted after removal from the barrels. Bourbon whiskey may be sold at less than 80 proof but must be labeled as "diluted bourbon".

They may not be reused for bourbon, and most are sold to distilleries in Canada, Scotland, Ireland, Mexico, and the Caribbean for aging other spirits. Some are employed in the manufacture of various barrel-aged products, including amateur and professionally brewed bourbon barrel-aged beer, barbecue sauce, wine, hot sauce, and others. Since 2011, Jim Beam has employed barrel rinsing on a large scale to extract bourbon from its used barrels, mixing the extract with a 6-year-old Beam bourbon to create a 90-proof product that it sells as "Devil's Cut".

The bottling operation for bourbon is the process of filtering, mixing together straight whiskey from different barrels (sometimes from different distilleries), diluting with water, blending with other ingredients (if producing blended bourbon), and filling containers to produce the final product that is marketed to consumers. By itself, the phrase "bottled by" means only that. Only if the bottler operates the distillery that produced the whiskey may "distilled by" be added to the label.

Labeling requirements for bourbon and other alcoholic beverages (including the requirements for what is allowed to be called bourbon under U.S. law) are defined in the U.S. Code of Federal Regulations. No whiskey made outside the U.S. may be labeled bourbon or sold as bourbon inside the U.S. Various other countries have trade agreements with the U.S. to recognize bourbon as a distinctive product of the U.S., including Canada and Mexico, the United Kingdom, Chile, and Brazil. 

A 2016 experiment by Louisville craft distiller Jefferson's Bourbon suggests that in the era before whiskey was routinely bottled at the distillery, Kentucky bourbon developed a superior taste because it was shipped in barrels, using water transport wherever practical. To test this theory, Jefferson's cofounder Trey Zoeller sent two barrels of the company's signature product to New York City via barge, first down the Ohio and Mississippi Rivers and then along the Intracoastal Waterway. As a control, he brought a batch of the same whiskey that had remained in Louisville during the same period. According to Popular Mechanics writer Jacqueline Detwiler, who documented the test, the sample that made the waterborne journey "was mature beyond its age, richer, with new flavors of tobacco, vanilla, caramel, and honey. It was some of the best bourbon any of us had ever drunk." It was theorized that the action of gentle sloshing of the whiskey in barrels for a period of 2 to 4 weeks during the barge trip led to a dramatic improvement in smoothness and taste. Chemical analysis of the two samples revealed significant differences in molecular profiles, with the sample transported by water having a greater diversity of aromatic compounds.

Uses

Bourbon is served in a variety of manners, including neat; diluted with water; over ice ("on the rocks"); with cola or other beverages in simple mixed drinks; and in cocktails – including the Manhattan, Bourbon Smash, the Old Fashioned, the whiskey sour, and the mint julep. Bourbon is also used in cooking, and it was historically used for medicinal purposes.

Bourbon can be used in a variety of confections such as a banana bourbon syrup for waffles, a flavoring for chocolate cake, and fruit-based desserts like grilled peach sundaes served with salted bourbon-caramel or brown sugar shortcake with warmed bourbon peaches. It is an optional ingredient in several pie recipes traditional to American cuisine, including pumpkin pie, where it can be combined with brown sugar and pecans to make a sweet and crunchy topping for the creamy pumpkin pie filling. It can also be used as a flavoring in sauces for savory dishes like grit cakes with country ham served with bourbon mayonnaise, Kentucky bourbon chili, and grilled flank steak.

See also

 American Whiskey Trail
 Bourbon Trail
 List of cocktails with bourbon
 List of maize dishes
 Moonshine
 Rye whiskey
 Single barrel whiskey
 Small batch

References

Notes

Citations

Further reading

 Carson, Gerald. The Social History of Bourbon: An Unhurried Account of Our Star-Spangled Drink (Lexington, KY: University Press of Kentucky), 1963. .
 Cowdery, Charles K.  Bourbon, Straight: The Uncut and Unfiltered Story of American Whiskey (Chicago: Made and Bottled in Kentucky), 2004. .
 Crowgey, Henry G.  Kentucky Bourbon: The Early Years of Whiskeymaking (Lexington, KY: University Press of Kentucky), 1971. .
 .
 Regan, Gary and Mardee Haidin Regan. The Bourbon Companion: A Connoisseur's Guide (Philadelphia, PA: Running Press), 1998. .

 
Economy of Kentucky
Economy of Louisville, Kentucky
Kentucky cuisine
Whisky